Parikipandla Narahari (born 1 March 1975) also known as P. Narahari is an Indian civil servant employed by the Indian Administrative Services and author. According to Tehelka, Narahari, in his capacity as District collector of Gwalior, is one of India's few civil servants to use social media platforms such as Twitter and Facebook to interact with citizenry to solve their problems. The issues citizens of Gwalior raise on Narahari's wall were automatically directed to concerned departments. The Better India recognized Narahari as 10 most inspiring IAS officers of the year 2017. Narahari is one among of those rare professional officers to be credited as Publicity Advisor to three successive governments of different parties. 

Narahari has written eight books, Who Owns Mhow? and The Making of Ladli Laxmi Yojna. The latter concerns the Ladli Laxmi Yojana, an initiative of the Government of Madhya Pradesh planned by Narahari which later inspired Beti Bachao, Beti Padhao Yojana. He also wrote the song Ho Halla which was sung by Shaan. In 2020, he started the program of Swachhta Ke Sur under Swachh Bharat Abhiyan to make people aware, which included Bollywood singer Shaan, Shankar Mahadevan, Javed Ali, Payal Dev, Rishiking and Dev Negi.

Early life
Narahari was born to Satyanarayana and Sarojana on 1 March 1975. His grandparents belong to Chintagattu village near Warangal. Narahari studied mechanical engineering at Osmania University and was selected to work with Indian Engineering Services in 1999. He was also selected for organisations Bharat Dynamics Limited (BDL), National Aluminium Company (Nalco) and Gas Authority of India Limited (GAIL). He was selected as Scientist-B at Advanced Research Centre International (ARCI), Department of Science and Technology, Government of India. He worked in this organisation from January 2000 to August 2001 till he joined the Indian Administrative Services in September 2001. He completed his schooling from India Mission Secondary School, Basantnagar. He completed Intermediate from NLVRGSRVJC(APRJC) Nimmakuru.
he was brought up in basanthnagar, Peddapalli mandal, Karimnagar district, Telangana.

Career
He joined the Indian Administrative Service in 2001. In 2002, he was posted as Assistant Collector at Chhindwara. He became the Assistant Collector and City Magistrate, Murar along with SDO (Revenue) & SDM Dabra in Gwalior in 2003, SDO (Revenue) & SDM Mhow in Indore in 2004. He was appointed as Municipal Commissioner of Indore Municipal Corporation in 2005. In 2006, he became Project Director ICDS & IFAD, managing director WFDC and ex-officio Deputy Secretary in Women and Child Development Department, Bhopal. In April 2007, he was transferred as chief executive officer of Chhindwara Zila Parishad and ex-officio Additional Collector (Development) there. On 9 August 2007, he became District Magistrate and Collector of Seoni, later in 2009 as DM & Collector of Singrauli, then as DM & Collector of Gwalior in 2011 and lastly as DM & Collector of Indore in 2015 and served till 2017. After serving as Revenue Secretary and Secretary & Commissioner of Aviation, Public Relations, Urban Administration Departments of Government of Madhya Pradesh., P Narahari IAS is presently posted as Managing Director, Madhya Pradesh Marketing Cooperative Federation and Secretary, Department of Micro, Small & Medium Enterprises (MSME) & Commissioner Industries, Government of Madhya Pradesh. He served as VC of MCNUJC from 8 January to 25 February 2019 and once again from 19 April to 21 May 2020.

He made Gwalior district 95% barrier-free in two years to help persons with disabilities, senior citizens, women easily access public spaces. Thus making Gwalior an example for other cities in India as reported by Satyamev Jayate.

In Indore as District Collector he focused on health, education and Smart Cities Mission. Indore also became the cleanest city in India under Swachh Bharat Abhiyan where Narahari played a key role. Narahari is credited for not only establishing Social Media wing in the Public Relations Department of Government but also making it a frequently-used tool for publicity of the government programs, policies and activities.

Discography

Hindi songs

Telugu songs

Bibliography

Books
Who Owns Mhow?
The Making of Ladli Laxmi Yojna
Rise of social media in Madhya Pradesh, published by Director Public Relations department, Government of Madhya Pradesh
Betiyaan, published by Indra Publications, Bhopal
The Great Tale of Hinduism, published by Manjul Publications, Bhopal
The Great Vedic Tales, published by Prabhat Prakashan, Delhi 
Swachh Indore, published by Prabhat Prakashan, Delhi

Awards
He got more than 45 awards for his excellent performance in his administrative career till now.

 2005: CRISIL Award 2005 for Excellence in Municipal Initiatives, as Municipal Commissioner Indore.
 2011: Dainik Bhaskar Group's India Pride Awards, in the category of Impact Creator-Civil Servant.
 2013: award from the Internet and Mobile Association of India for his efforts relating to use of social networks to engage citizens.
 2014: Awarded by Madhya Pradesh Agency for Promotion of IT under category "Best project implemented through innovative use of Information Technology" of project Hamari Ladli
 2014: Awarded by India Book of Records for organizing a tree plantation event in which 1,33,000 plants were sowed in one day
 2014: Received Manthan Award for usage of Active Tracker Device to eliminate female foeticide under Save girls campaign.
 2014: Received National Award for "Empowerment of Persons with Diabilities" by President Pranab Mukherjee for creation of barrier-free environment for the persons with disabilities in Gwalior district.
 2015: Received 'Public Servant of the Year' by UBM Giving Back CSR & NGO Awards 2015.
 2016: Received National Award for "Empowerment of Persons with Disabilities, 2016" by President Pranab Mukherjee for "Outstanding Work in the Creation of Barrier-Free Environment for the Persons with Disabilities".
 2016: Received ‘District Collector Digital Champions’ award for influential implementation of ICT.
 2017: Awarded at 8th NCPEDP-Mphasis Universal Design Awards 2017.
 2018: Awarded Joint Runner-up in "e-Governance Excellence Awards Madhya Pradesh 2017" under "Improvement in Citizen Service Delivery/Governance through use of IT" category by Madhya Pradesh Agency for Promotion for Information Technology
 2018: Received Excellent Contribution Award in "G Files Governance Awards" for his unique socio-economic development initiatives in state of Madhya Pradesh

References

External links
 
 Parikipandla Narahari on VIDHATHA e-Magazine

Indian male poets
Indian lyricists
Telugu-language lyricists
1975 births
Living people
Osmania University alumni
Indian Administrative Service officers
People from Karimnagar